Wang Xinyu and Wang Xiyu were the defending champions, but chose not to participate.

Savannah Broadus and Abigail Forbes won the title, defeating Kamilla Bartone and Oksana Selekhmeteva in the final, 7–5, 5–7, 6–2.

Seeds

Draw

Finals

Top half

Bottom half

External links 
 Draw

Girls' Doubles
Wimbledon Championship by year – Girls' doubles